This is a list of episodes for the animated series, The Ruff and Reddy Show.

Each season consists of four story arcs, each of which is divided into thirteen segments.

Series overview

Episodes

Season 1: 1957–58

Season 2: 1958–59

Season 3: 1959–60

References

External links

List of episodes @ Wingnut
Toon Tracker: Ruff & Reddy
Toonopedia's Ruff & Reddy entry

Ruff and Reddy